The Quebrada de Ullúm Dam, or simply Ullúm Dam, is an embankment dam on the San Juan River, just west of San Juan in Ullúm Department of the Province of San Juan, Argentina.

The region is arid, with mean annual rainfall below , and is traversed by the rivers San Juan and Jáchal. It also allows for recreational and tourist activities.

Work on the dam began in 1969, and the facility was inaugurated on December 3, 1980.

References

 Energy Secretariat, Ministry of Economy, Argentina.  Presa de Ullum.

Dams completed in 1980
Energy infrastructure completed in 1981
Dams in Argentina
Hydroelectric power stations in Argentina
Buildings and structures in San Juan Province, Argentina